"At or with Me" is a song by American singer-songwriter Jack Johnson. It is the second single from his fifth studio album, To the Sea.

Music video
The song's music video features Johnson alongside comedian Andy Samberg. The video takes place at a "secret show" of Johnson's, which Samberg attends. Samberg remarks of Johnson being "the fucking mellow man," a reference to the SNL skit of which Samberg plays a parody of Johnson. Johnson then notices Samberg's presence, and asks one of his bandmates if he is "that guy from Saturday Night Live who makes fun of me." He replies affirmatively, and Johnson proceeds to perform the song, using its lyrics to seemingly address Samberg. As he performs, Samberg continues to make derogatory remarks and actions about Johnson. This eventually leads to Johnson briefly stopping the song, jumping off stage and onto Samberg. Johnson continues singing the song as he and Samberg fight with each other. Eventually, Johnson knocks Samberg down onto a road, and Samberg is hit by a car. Johnson helps him up, and the two apparently make amends. Johnson gets back on stage and continues the rest of the song. However, as he finishes the song, Samberg takes a chair and knocks Johnson out and off the stage. Samberg proclaims "Hacky sack that, motherfucker!" to Johnson as he walks off the stage.

Prior to the release of the video, people could "bet" on either Samberg or Johnson winning the fight by clicking a Facebook "like" button designated for the person of choice.

Track listing
CD single

 "At or with Me" - 3:58

Chart performance

References

2010 singles
Jack Johnson (musician) songs
Songs written by Jack Johnson (musician)
2010 songs
Universal Records singles